Ilias Anastasakos (born 3 March 1978) is a Greek football player who plays as a striker for Olympiacos Assou. He is the co-director of the Super League Athletic Academy Soccer Camp that takes place every summer in New York City.

Club career
Anastasakos started his football career from AO Dafniou having previously played in Pangythiakos and Leonidas Glykovrysis. In the summer of 1995, he was transferred to AEK Athens. He stayed at the club until January 2002, playing in just 1 league match, while he was loaned to Aris Petroupolis, Apollon Athens and Kalamata. After AEK he returned to Apollon Athens playing for 2 seasons. He also spent 2 seasons at Asteras Tripolis and signed for Thrasivoulos, where he emerged as the top scorer of the second division in 2008 with 18 goals. His good appearances with the club of Fyli earned him a transfer to PAOK, where he played for a year, before moving to Atromitos, where he spent 3 seasons and played twice in the Cup final. In 2012 he moved to Crete to play for Platanias for a season and then he was transferred to Ergotelis. In the summer of 2014, he had a short spell at AEL and in January 2015, he was signed to Sparta, where he played 2 years. In 2017 he joined AE Pellanias for two seasons, initially as a player-coach and then solely as a coach. He returned as a footballer in 2019 to play for Aris Skalas until 2020. He then moved to Iraklis Karyas, where he played for two seasons. In February 2022 he was announced by Olympiacos Assou.

Honours
Thrasyvoulos
Beta Ethniki top scorer: 2007–08

International career
Anastasakos played for Greece U19 once in 1996.

References

External links
Onsports Profile
"On this day, Anastasakos was born" at Ekatse.gr

1978 births
Living people
Greek footballers
Thrasyvoulos F.C. players
PAOK FC players
Atromitos F.C. players
Athinaikos F.C. players
Apollon Smyrnis F.C. players
Kalamata F.C. players
AEK Athens F.C. players
Asteras Tripolis F.C. players
Ergotelis F.C. players
A.E. Sparta P.A.E. players
Super League Greece players
Association football forwards
People from Laconia
Footballers from the Peloponnese